Glycomyces scopariae is a bacterium from the genus of Glycomyces which has been isolated from roots of the plant Scoparia dulcis from Xishuangbanna in China.

References 

Actinomycetia
Bacteria described in 2009